This is the discography of Wild Willy Barrett. It comprises a number of albums and singles.

Discography

Albums

CD Albums

Compilations

Singles

Videos & DVDs

Production and session work/appearances

Discographies of British artists